Orlik  is a settlement in the administrative district of Gmina Łukta, within Ostróda County, Warmian-Masurian Voivodeship, in northern Poland. Current population is 545 or 550

References

Orlik